Ene Ergma (born 29 February 1944, in Rakvere) is an Estonian politician, a member of the Riigikogu (Estonian parliament), and scientist. She was a member of the political party Union of Pro Patria and Res Publica and, before the two parties merged, a member of Res Publica Party. On 1 June 2016, Ergma announced her resignation from the party, because the party had lost its identity and turned populist.

Education and scientific career
Ergma received her Diploma cum laude (BSc/MSc equivalent) in astronomy and PhD in physics and mathematics from Lomonosov Moscow State University, and a DSc degree from Institute of Space Research, Moscow. Before entering politics she worked as a professor of Astronomy at University of Tartu, Estonia (since 1988). In 1994, she was elected to the Estonian Academy of Sciences. Most of her scientific research has been done on the evolution of the compact objects (such as white dwarfs and neutron stars) and also gamma ray bursts.

Political career
From March 2003 until March 2006, Ergma was Speaker of the Riigikogu. From March 2006 to April 2007, she was the second Vice-President of the Riigikogu. On 2 April 2007 she was re-elected as Speaker of the Riigikogu and kept the post until March 2014.

Ergma was the only candidate in the first round of the 2006 presidential election in the Riigikogu on 28 August 2006. She gathered 65 votes, 3 votes less than the at least 2/3 of the Riigikogu votes necessary for the election.

She also ran along Volli Kalm and Birute Klaas for the presidency of University of Tartu, but was not elected.

She is the chairwoman of the Space Research Committee of the Riigikogu.

See also
List of Estonians

References

1944 births
Living people
People from Rakvere
Res Publica Party politicians
Isamaa politicians
Members of the Riigikogu, 2003–2007
Members of the Riigikogu, 2007–2011
Members of the Riigikogu, 2011–2015
Speakers of the Riigikogu
20th-century Estonian physicists
Members of the Estonian Academy of Sciences
Moscow State University alumni
Recipients of the Order of the National Coat of Arms, 2nd Class
21st-century Estonian politicians
21st-century Estonian women politicians
20th-century women scientists
21st-century Estonian physicists
21st-century women scientists
Estonian women physicists
Estonian women scientists
Women members of the Riigikogu
Recipients of the Order of the White Star, 4th Class